The March 2022 Australian federal budget was the federal budget to fund government services and operations. The budget was presented to the House of Representatives by Treasurer Josh Frydenberg on 29 March 2022. It was the ninth budget to be handed down by the Liberal/National Coalition since their election to government at the 2013 federal election, the fourth budget to be handed down by Frydenberg and the Morrison Government and the last budget to be handed down by the Morrison Government prior to the 2022 Australian federal election. It was the first of two federal budgets to be handed down in 2022; a second budget was delivered in October by the successive government.

Background
Despite a surplus having been projected for 2023/24, the March 2022 budget predicted a deficit as result of increasing cost of living pressures imposed due to the ongoing COVID-19 pandemic.

Forecasts

Revenues
Revenue was forecasted to be $547.6 for 2022–23.

Income taxation

Indirect taxation

Non-taxation receipts

Memorandum

Expenditure
Total expenditure for 2022–23 was forecasted to be $628 billion.

Debt and deficit

Deficit
The Budget underlying cash deficit for 2022/23 was expected to be $78 billion, falling $20.9 billion from 2021/22.

Debt
The Australian government's debt level was forecasted to be $977 billion for 2022–23, whilst net debt was forecasted to be $714.9 billion. Debt was forecasted to reach $1.16 trillion by the 2015/26 financial year.

Opposition and crossbench response

Reception

See also

 Australian government debt
 Economy of Australia
 Taxation in Australia

References

External links
Official website
Budget Speech transcript, delivered by Josh Frydenberg

Australian budgets
Australian federal budget
Australian federal budget
2022 in Australian politics
March 2022 events in Australia